(also written 2015 ME131) was a lost asteroid and a Near-Earth object (NEO). It is an Atira asteroid, which is by far the smallest group of near-Earth objects. This makes it an interior-Earth object (IEO), meaning that it has an orbit entirely confined within Earth's orbit. It was removed from the Sentry Risk Table on February 15, 2021 after the two orbits were linked together. It was first observed on June 23, 2015, when the asteroid was more than 1 AU from Earth and had a solar elongation of 68 degrees.

This asteroid was in both the Risk list and the Priority List of the European Space Agency (ESA) - Space Situational Awareness (SSA). This asteroid was also in the Sentry list of the Jet Propulsion Laboratory (JPL) - Center for Near Earth Object Studies (CNEOS). According to the Sentry List, of the possible close encounters with Earth in the foreseeable future, an encounter on August 18, 2020 had the highest Palermo Technical Impact Hazard Scale value.

According to the Near Earth Objects Dynamic Site (NEODyS), of the possible close encounters with Earth in the foreseeable future, an encounter on August 10, 2025 is the most likely. This encounter has a minimum possible distance of zero, meaning that an impact onto Earth is possible.

See also

References

External links 
 
 
 

Minor planet object articles (unnumbered)

Near-Earth objects removed from the Sentry Risk Table
20150623